The 2015–16 Slovak First Football League (known as the Slovak Fortuna Liga for sponsorship reasons) was the 23rd season of the first-tier football league in Slovakia since its establishment in 1993. AS Trenčín were the defending champions, after winning their 1st Slovak championship.

Teams

A total of 12 teams competed in the league, including 10 sides from the 2014–15 season and two who were promoted from the 2. liga.

Relegation for MFK Košice and FK Dukla Banská Bystrica to the 2015–16 DOXXbet liga was confirmed on 30 May 2015. These two relegated teams were replaced by 2. liga champion MFK Zemplín Michalovce and 2. liga runner-up MFK Skalica. Both teams made their debut at the highest level. Despite that MFK Košice finished as 6th, they did not obtain a licence for the 2015–16 season.

Stadiums and locations

1Some matches were played at Mestský štadión Brezno in Brezno while ZELPO Aréna had been under renovation.
2Some matches were played at NTC Poprad in Poprad while Štadión MFK Ružomberok had been under renovation.
3Some matches were played at OMS Arena in Senica while Mestský štadión Skalica had been under renovation.

Personnel and kits

Managerial changes

League table

Results

First and second round

Third round

Season statistics

Top goalscorers
Updated through matches played on 20 May 2016.

Hat-tricks

Note
4 Player scored 4 goals

Clean sheets

Updated through matches played on 20 May 2016

Discipline

Player

Most yellow cards: 12
 Marin Ljubičić (DAC Dunajska Streda)

Most red cards: 3
 Ján Maslo (MFK Ružomberok)

Club

Most yellow cards: 95 
FC Spartak Trnava

Most red cards: 8 
MFK Ružomberok

Awards

Player of the Month

Top Eleven
Source:
Goalkeeper:  Ján Mucha (Slovan Bratislava)
Defence:  Martin Šulek (AS Trenčín),  Kornel Saláta (Slovan Bratislava),  Milan Škriniar (MŠK Žilina),  Kingsley Madu (AS Trenčín)
Midfield:  Viktor Pečovský (MŠK Žilina),  Ibrahim Rabiu (AS Trenčín),   Gino van Kessel (AS Trenčín),  Matúš Bero (AS Trenčín),  Erik Pačinda (DAC D.Streda)
Attack:  David Depetris (Spartak Trnava)

Individual Awards

Manager of the season

Martin Ševela (AS Trenčín)

Player of the Year

Matúš Bero (AS Trenčín)

Young player of the Year

Martin Šulek (AS Trenčín)

See also
2015–16 Slovak Cup
2015–16 2. Liga (Slovakia)
 List of transfers winter 2015–16
 List of transfers summer 2015
 List of foreign players

References

External links
 
 uefa.com

2015–16 in European association football leagues
2015-16
1